Periyavaram is a panchayat in Nellore, Andhra Pradesh, India.

Periyavaram is located near to Venkatagiri, just 1 km away from Venkatagiri railway station. The village consists of around 30 to 50 houses, with a population of 300. Periyavaram is also Panchayath.

Villages in Nellore district